Ghana competed at the 2020 Summer Olympics in Tokyo. Originally scheduled to take place from 24 July to 9 August 2020, the Games were postponed to 23 July to 8 August 2021, because of the COVID-19 pandemic. It was the nation's fifteenth appearance at the Summer Olympics, having taken part in all but three editions since its debut (as the Gold Coast) in 1952. Ghana did not attend Montreal 1976 because of the African boycott, as well as the Moscow 1980, when the nation joined the United States-led boycott.

Medalists

Competitors
The following is the list of number of competitors in the Games.

Athletics

Ghanaian athletes achieved the entry standards, either by qualifying time or by world ranking, in the following track and field events (up to a maximum of 3 athletes in each event):

Track & road events

Field events

Boxing

Ghana entered three boxers into the Olympic tournament. London 2012 Olympian Sulemanu Tetteh (men's flyweight) and rookie Samuel Takyi (men's featherweight) scored a box-off victory each to secure places in their respective weight divisions at the 2020 African Qualification Tournament in Diamniadio, Senegal. Shakul Samed completed the nation's boxing lineup by topping the list of eligible boxers from Africa in the men's light heavyweight division of the IOC's Boxing Task Force Rankings.

Judo

Ghana qualified one judoka for the men's middleweight category (90 kg) at the Games. Kwadjo Anani accepted a continental berth from Africa as the nation's top-ranked judoka outside of direct qualifying position in the IJF World Ranking List of June 28, 2021.

Swimming

Ghana received a universality invitation from FINA to send two top-ranked swimmers (one per gender) in their respective individual events to the Olympics, based on the FINA Points System of June 28, 2021.

Weightlifting

Ghana entered one male weightlifter into the Olympic competition. Rio 2016 Olympian Christian Amoah topped the list of weightlifters from Africa in the men's 96 kg category based on the IWF Absolute Continental Rankings.

References

Nations at the 2020 Summer Olympics
2020
2021 in Ghanaian sport